Mirjawali Mair is a village in Hanumangarh district of Rajasthan, India.

Villages in Hanumangarh district